"Project Nightmare" is a science fiction short story by American writer Robert A. Heinlein, first published in Amazing Stories, May 1953, and reprinted in various collections, including The Menace from Earth.

Plot summary
The story posits the reality of clairvoyance and telekinetic ability among a small number of people. In an opening scene, telekinetics are shown to be capable of causing a sub-critical mass of plutonium to explode as if it were a critical mass, simply by thinking about it (that is, by telekinetically enhancing its internal neutron emission).  Conversely, they are able to prevent a critical mass from exploding.  When the United States is held hostage with nuclear weapons planted around the nation by the Soviet Union, all known clairvoyants and telekinetic operators are gathered together and tasked with finding the bombs and preventing them from exploding.  Each operator is given one city; but as time elapses and not all the bombs have been located, some of the operators lose their abilities through fatigue, and others are required to take on more than one city simultaneously.  Eventually the bombs are found and disabled, with one exception (in Cleveland, when a project officer mistakenly distracts the protecting operator).  In the final scene, the President requests that the psychics turn the tables on those who threatened them, by locating and exploding bombs in Russia.

References

External links 
 
 "Project Nightmare" at the Internet Archive

1953 short stories
Short stories by Robert A. Heinlein
Works originally published in Amazing Stories